James Chidester Egbert Jr., Ph. D. (1859–1948) was an American classical scholar and educator.

He was born in New York City. He graduated at Columbia University in 1881, and took a doctorate there in 1884. He then became a professor of Classical studies  and was dean of the School of Business there from 1916 to 1932. In 1911 he became active in the American Academy in Rome, serving on various committees and becoming vice president from 1940-1944.

His works include an edition of Macmillan's Shorter Latin Course (1892); Cicero de Senectute (1895); Introduction to the Study of Latin Inscriptions (1895); and Livy xxi and Selections from xxii to xxx (1913). He also wrote a four-volume work American Business Practice (1931).

References

External links
 
Background Info.

1859 births
1948 deaths
American classical scholars
Columbia College (New York) alumni
Classical scholars of Columbia University